Sid and Marty Krofft's Red Eye Express was a late-night variety special that aired on CBS on March 9, 1988.  It was the lowest-rated program on network television that week.

Plot
Featuring a format similar to the Kroffts' then-current syndicated series, D.C. Follies, Ron Reagan stars as the owner of The Red Eye Express, a nightclub frequented by celebrities (and celebrity look-alike Krofft puppets). Through the course of the hour, Reagan mingles with various puppets (Cher, Jack Nicholson, Whoopi Goldberg, Ronald Reagan Sr., etc.), real-life people (Chuck Berry, Lou Albano) and performing guests (Gloria Estefan, Eric Carmen, Rick Astley).

Music
Gloria Estefan and the Miami Sound Machine – "Anything for You", "Surrender"
Rick Astley – "Never Gonna Give You Up"
Eric Carmen – "Hungry Eyes"

References

1980s American television specials
Television pilots not picked up as a series
American television shows featuring puppetry
1988 television specials
1988 in American television
Sid and Marty Krofft